Penola Catholic College, Emu Plains (previously McCarthy Catholic College Emu Plains) is an independent Roman Catholic co-educational secondary day school located in the western Sydney suburb of Emu Plains, New South Wales, Australia.

Overview
Penola Catholic College is a Catholic co-educational school for students from Year 7 to Year 12 which currently incorporates a traditional Higher School Certificate pathway for Years 11 and 12.

See also

Catholic Education in the Diocese of Parramatta
List of Catholic schools in New South Wales
Catholic education in Australia

References 

Catholic secondary schools in Sydney
Educational institutions established in 1986
1986 establishments in Australia
Emu Plains, New South Wales
Roman Catholic Diocese of Parramatta